The Master Builders Association of King and Snohomish Counties (MBAKS) is a trade association of homebuilders, remodelers and associated businesses in the state of Washington. The association is the oldest and largest of the National Association of Home Builders more than 800 local home builders associations.

History

MBAKS was founded in 1909 by a group of Seattle builders who saw the need to promote and protect the viability of the housing industry.

Today MBAKS has more than 4,300 members who employ more than 80,000 workers in the housing industry. Over its one-hundred years of operation, the association continues to take an active role in all facets of home construction in the Puget Sound region.

Its membership is dedicated to providing a wide range of housing choices, including affordable homes for the important first-time buyer market, and it supports transitional housing programs, workforce education and green building standards.

Advocacy

MBAKS has actively worked with local and state governments to develop laws to protect the environment while still providing attractive, affordable communities and homes for the families of the Puget Sound region.

MBAKS promotes continuing education to keep its membership current with the latest building innovations and safety procedures. The association also provides scholarships and training for students interested in pursuing a career in the industry.

Community Giving

MBAKS has two charitable foundations: Master Builders Care Foundation, which supports community projects and groups offering transitional housing and shelters; and Master Builders Career Connection, which provides scholarships and training for the residential construction trades.

Leaders in Green Building

MBAKS, in partnership with King and Snohomish counties, created the Built Green program, one of the nation's most successful green building programs. Built Green is a residential building program promoting environmentally sensitive building practices and products.

Seattle Home Show 

MBAKS is a sponsor of the annual Seattle Home Show and Seattle Home Show 2. The home show was started in 1939 as a way to showcase the housing industry and promote home sales during the Great Depression. It will celebrate its 69th annual year of operation in 2013.

External links 
 Master Builders Association of King and Snohomish Counties
 BuiltGreen
 Northwest Home Facts
 Compra Hoy
 Seattle Home Show
 Nation's Building News - Nation's Oldest HBA Celebrates 100 Years of Service

References

 Master Builders Association of King and Snohomish Counties Homepage*
 About MBAKS
 Built Green

Professional associations based in the United States